Logan Gomez (born December 16, 1988) is an American race car driver from Crown Point, Indiana who most notably competed in the Firestone Indy Lights Series (formerly the Indy Pro Series).

He made his debut at the 2006 Liberty Challenge at the Indianapolis Motor Speedway road course while competing in the Star Mazda series full-time. He moved full-time to the Indy Pro Series in 2007 by bringing iSilon Systems backing to fund a ride at Sam Schmidt Motorsports. Gomez finished 7th in points and captured one win in the final race of the season at Chicagoland Speedway by a mere 0.0005 seconds over teammate and series champion Alex Lloyd, a margin which the league claims is the smallest margin of victory in racing history. He returned to Guthrie Racing, the team that he made his debut with in 2006 for the 2008 season, finishing 7th in points with a best finish of 2nd in the second race at Infineon Raceway. For the 2009 Indy Lights season, he ran the first two races of the season (the St. Pete double-header) for Alliance Motorsports but the team did not arrive at the second race weekend in Long Beach.

Indy Lights

References

External links

1988 births
Indy Lights drivers
Indy Pro 2000 Championship drivers
Living people
Sportspeople from Trenton, New Jersey
Racing drivers from New Jersey
People from Crown Point, Indiana

Arrow McLaren SP drivers